Listener Supported is an album by the Dave Matthews Band, released on November 23, 1999.  It was recorded live at Continental Airlines Arena in East Rutherford, New Jersey on September 11, 1999.

In addition to being the third live release by Dave Matthews Band, Listener Supported was filmed by PBS for an In the Spotlight special, and the entire concert was released on VHS the same day and DVD on February 8, 2000. The title of this release is taken from PBS's "supported by viewers like you" underwriting spot. It is currently the only Dave Matthews Band live album to not contain the date or location in the title.  This is because part of the broadcast agreement allowed PBS to release their own audio CD version of the television special.

Listener Supported was also the first live release to feature keyboardist Butch Taylor and "The Lovely Ladies" on vocals. In addition to songs from each of their RCA studio albums, Listener Supported features the previously unreleased songs "#40", "True Reflections" (sung by Boyd Tinsley), and the heartbeat intro to "Pantala Naga Pampa", as well as the full band versions of "#36", "Granny" and "Long Black Veil".

Track listing
All songs by David J. Matthews unless noted.

Disc one
 Intro – 6:25
 "Pantala Naga Pampa" – 0:41
 "Rapunzel" (Matthews, Beauford, Lessard)– 7:09
 "Rhyme & Reason" – 5:58
 "The Stone" – 7:28
 "#41" – 9:47
 "Crash into Me" – 6:02
contains an interpolation from the composition "Dixie Chicken" (Lowell George, Martin Kibbee)
 "Jimi Thing" – 13:12
 "#36" – 7:34
with The Lovely Ladies
 "Warehouse" – 8:32

Disc two
"Too Much" (Matthews, Beauford, Moore, Lessard, Tinsley) – 4:52
 "True Reflections" (Tinsley) – 7:25
with The Lovely Ladies
"Two Step" – 14:38
 "Granny" – 4:24
 "Stay (Wasting Time)" (Matthews, Lessard, Moore) – 7:07
with The Lovely Ladies
 "#40" – 1:49
solo by Dave Matthews
 "Long Black Veil" (Dill, Wilkin) – 8:44with The Lovely Ladies''
 "Don't Drink the Water" – 7:09
 Intro to... – 1:36
 "All Along the Watchtower" (Dylan) – 7:51

Personnel
Dave Matthews Band
Carter Beauford – percussion, drums, vocals
Stefan Lessard – bass guitar
Dave Matthews – guitar, vocals
LeRoi Moore – saxophone, horns
Boyd Tinsley – violin, lead vocals on "True Reflections"

Additional musicians
The Lovely Ladies – backing vocals
Tawatha Agee
Chinah Bess
Brenda White King
Butch Taylor – keyboards

Charts

Weekly charts

Year-end charts

Certifications

References

Albums produced by John Alagía
Dave Matthews Band live albums
1999 live albums
Bertelsmann Music Group live albums
1999 video albums
Dave Matthews Band video albums
Live video albums